Bart Claessen (born 22 January 1980, Asten, Netherlands) is a Dutch dance DJ. He is best known for the Trance songs "On the Move" and "Infected" (both 2001 and as Barthezz), which reached numbers 18 and 25 in the UK Singles Chart respectively.

He has released a number of tracks under his own name, most notably "First Light" (2007) and "Madness" (2008).

References

External links
 Bart Claessen official site
 Bart Claessen MySpace
 Interview on Trance Hub, March 2012

1980 births
Living people
Club DJs
Dutch DJs
Dutch dance musicians
People from Asten, Netherlands
Electronic dance music DJs
Anjunabeats artists
Dutch trance musicians